Ya Naa Yakubu (Yakuba) I was Ya-Na, or king, of the Kingdom of Dagbon in northern Ghana.

See also 
 List of rulers of the Northern state of Dagomba

References 

African royalty
Dagomba people
Dagbon
African kings